Blumenheim is an unincorporated community in Saskatchewan.

Village with fewer than 100 people residing. The community has a strong Mennonite background.

Corman Park No. 344, Saskatchewan
Unincorporated communities in Saskatchewan